is a train station in Sakyō-ku, Kyoto, Kyoto Prefecture, Japan.

Lines
Eizan Electric Railway (Eiden)
Eizan Main Line
Kurama Line

Layout
The station has an island platform serving 2 tracks between 2 side platforms serving a track each.

Adjacent stations

See also
List of railway stations in Japan

References

Railway stations in Kyoto Prefecture
Railway stations in Japan opened in 1925